The rufous-fronted bushtit or rufous-fronted tit (Aegithalos iouschistos) is a small passerine bird of the eastern and central Himalayas belonging to the long-tailed tit family, Aegithalidae.

Taxonomy and systematics
The rufous-fronted bushtit forms a superspecies with the black-browed bushtit and white-throated bushtit. They have sometimes been regarded as a single species but are now usually treated as distinct. The ranges of the rufous-fronted and black-browed bushtits overlap slightly in China with no evidence of hybridization.

Description
The rufous-fronted bushtit is 11 cm long. The adult has grey upperparts and reddish-brown underparts. The head is reddish-buff with a black mask and a silver bib with black streaks and a black edge. Juveniles are paler and duller than the adults. The black-browed bushtit is similar but has a white forehead and belly and a white edge to its bib. The white-throated bushtit has a white forehead and bib and a dark breastband.

Distribution and habitat
The rufous-fronted bushtit is found in the eastern and central Himalayas in Bhutan, China, India and Nepal. It occurs in montane forests, both broad-leaved and coniferous, up to 3,600 m above sea-level. It typically feeds in flocks.

References

 Grimmett, Richard, Carol Inskipp & Tim Inskipp (1999) Pocket Guide to the Birds of the Indian Subcontinent, Christopher Helm, London.
 MacKinnon, John & Karen Phillipps (2000) A Field Guide to the Birds of China, Oxford University Press, Oxford.

External links

Oriental Bird Images: Rufous-fronted bushtit

rufous-fronted bushtit
Birds of Bhutan
Birds of Northeast India
Birds of Nepal
rufous-fronted bushtit
rufous-fronted bushtit